Dinagat hairy-tailed rat or russet batomys (Batomys russatus) is one of five species of rodent in the genus Batomys. It is in the diverse family Muridae.
This species is endemic to the Philippines.

Distribution
This rat is found on Dinagat Island and possibly on other islands nearby. Further surveys have yet to be carried out, but it is currently endangered according to the IUCN.

References

Rats of Asia
Batomys
Endemic fauna of the Philippines
Fauna of Dinagat Islands
Rodents of the Philippines
Mammals described in 1998